The People's Democratic Movement was a minor political party in Dominica. The party was founded in 2007 and led by Williams Riviere, a former executive member of the Dominica Labour Party. In the 2009 elections it put forward three candidates. However, they received only 179 votes (0.49%) and failed to win a seat.

References

External links
Party website

Political parties established in 2007
Political parties in Dominica